The Soldier's Return is the first novel in a quartet written by Melvyn Bragg.

Plot summary
Sam Richardson returns to the small Cumbrian town of Wigton after fighting in Burma during the Second World War. The war has given Sam’s wife Ellen a newfound confidence and Sam is a stranger to his son Joe. Sam is plagued by memories of the war and wants a new life, for himself, his wife and his son.

The book won the WH Smith Literary Award in 2000, and was followed by three sequels.

Sequels

A Son of War (2001)
Sam Richardson is still struggling with effects of World War Two and to re-establish his relationship with his wife Ellen and young son Joe. Sam wants to become his own boss and start a business.

Crossing the Lines (2003)
Joe Richardson is changing from an immature schoolboy into a confident student at Oxford who has the world at his feet. His parents Sam and Ellen have reconciled some of their difficulties and are drifting into middle-age.

Remember Me... (2008)
Joe, still at Oxford, meets French art student Natasha. The story of their love and lives has been described as both "semi-autobiographical" and "nakedly autobiographical".

References

Novels by Melvyn Bragg
1999 British novels
Novels set in Cumbria
Hodder & Stoughton books